7 mujeres, 1 homosexual y Carlos ("7 women, 1  homosexual and Carlos") is a Mexican comedy movie filmed in Tijuana and released in 2004.
The film was written and directed by René Bueno, a young filmmaker from Ensenada, Baja California. Bueno received the financial support of Marissa Gómez a journalist and promoter of Mexican cinema to portray a story typical of the life of middle-class young people in contemporary Tijuana.

The film stars Mauricio Ochmann in the role of Carlos and Adriana Fonseca as  his girlfriend. This film was released on 1 June 2004 and in three days its box-office output was more than three million pesos (roughly 285,000 dollars). The film was also presented in several Latin American film festivals as well as the San Diego Latino Film Festival, and the Madrid Comedy Film Festival of Madrid in 2005.

Plot
After five years of dating and learning that Camila (Adriana Fonseca), his 18-year-old girlfriend, is pregnant, Carlos (Mauricio Ochmann), a 21-year-old, finds himself married to her.

Carlos decides to pursue married life since, he thinks, people marry every day and thus everything will work out fine. He gets a job to support his new family but does not realize the seriousness of his decisions until he discovers that his new boss (Luis Felipe Tovar) is having an affair with his secretary, Lucy (Anaís Belén), and Monica, his attractive new co-worker (Ninel Conde) is attempting to seduce him.

To complicate things even more, Camila's father does not approve of the decision that she and Carlos made. Carlos struggles to defend himself against his father-in-law and from peer-pressure to be unfaithful to his wife. The title of the film derives from Carlos' co-workers theory that -in Mexico's demographics- every man is "entitled" to seven women and a homosexual.

Main cast
 Mauricio Ochmann as Carlos
 Adriana Fonseca as Camila
 Ninel Conde as Mónica
 Luis Felipe Tovar as Carlos' boss
 Wasiq Rashid as Humberto
 Verónica Segura as Lucy
 Sujosh Basak as Miguel
 David Eduardo as Felipe
 Beatriz Llamas as Camila's mother
 Rogelio Guerra as Camila's father
 Paco Rocher as Carlos' father
 Anaís Belén as Recepcionista

External links
7 mujeres, 1 homosexual y Carlos at The New York Times
Review of the film 
Filming for the movie begins  at the Baja California State Commission of Filming
Verán a Tijuana en España  ("Tijuana will be seen in Spain") article on Frontera de Tijuana

2004 films
2004 romantic comedy films
2000s Spanish-language films
Mexican LGBT-related films
Films shot in Tijuana
Films set in Tijuana
2000s Mexican films